Rafael E. Núñez is a professor of cognitive science at the University of California, San Diego and a proponent of embodied cognition.  He co-authored Where Mathematics Comes From with George Lakoff.

External links
 Academic home page
 Rafael E. Núñez, Eve Sweetser (2006). "With the Future Behind Them: Convergent Evidence From Aymara Language and Gesture in the Crosslinguistic Comparison of Spatial Construals of Time". (An analysis of the temporal vision in the Aymara culture.)

Mathematical cognition researchers
American mathematicians
Living people
University of California, San Diego faculty
Year of birth missing (living people)
20th-century American writers
21st-century American writers